Schizophrys is a genus of crabs in the family Majidae, containing the following species:
 Schizophrys aspera (H. Milne Edwards, 1834)
 Schizophrys dahlak (Griffin & Tranter, 1986)
 Schizophrys dama (Herbst, 1804)
 Schizophrys dichotomus (Latreille, 1831)
 Schizophrys pakistanensis (Tirmizi & Kazmi, 1995)
 Schizophrys rufescens (Griffin & Tranter, 1986)
 Schizophrys serratus (White, 1847) (nomen nudum)
 Schizophrys spiniger (White, 1847) (nomen nudum)
 Schizophrys hilensis (Rathbun, 1906) accepted as Schizophroida hilensis (Rathbun, 1906)
 Schizophrys serratus (White, 1848) accepted as Schizophrys aspera (H. Milne Edwards, 1834)
 Schizophrys spiniger (White, 1848) accepted as Cyclax spinicinctus (Heller, 1861)

References 

Majoidea